Charles Anderson  (1827 – 19 April 1899) was by birth an English recipient of the Victoria Cross, the highest award for gallantry in the face of the enemy that can be awarded to British and Commonwealth forces.

Anderson was about 32 years old, and a private in the 2nd Queen's Dragoon Guards during the Indian Mutiny when the action for which he and Thomas Monaghan were awarded the Victoria Cross took place:

He later achieved the rank of corporal. Charles Anderson was buried at Princess Road Cemetery, Seaham, near Sunderland, County Durham in section A, grave 1271.

His Victoria Cross is displayed at the Queen's Dragoon Guards Regimental Museum in Cardiff Castle, Wales.

References

Irish Winners of the Victoria Cross (Richard Doherty & David Truesdale, 2000)
Monuments to Courage (David Harvey, 1999)
The Register of the Victoria Cross (This England, 1997)

External links
Burial location of Charles Anderson "Co Durham"
Location of Charles Anderson's Victoria Cross "1st, The Queen's Dragoon Guards Museum"

1827 births
1899 deaths
Indian Rebellion of 1857 recipients of the Victoria Cross
2nd Dragoon Guards (Queen's Bays) soldiers
British recipients of the Victoria Cross
Victoria Cross awardees from Liverpool
British Army recipients of the Victoria Cross